The 1986 United States Senate election in Arkansas was held November 4, 1986. Incumbent Democratic U.S. Senator Dale Bumpers won re-election to a third term.

Major candidates

Democratic 
 Dale Bumpers, incumbent U.S. Senator and former Governor

Republican 
 Asa Hutchinson, former U.S. Attorney

Results

See also
 1986 United States Senate elections

References

1986
Arkansas
1986 Arkansas elections